St Alban's Church, Holborn, is a Church of England parish church in Holborn, central London, for a time becoming one of two churches of its parish which retains the name and St Peter's Saffron Hill to serve the mixed-use zone, notable for jewel-setting and for law firms. It has been Grade II* listed since 1951. This land is commonly – other than mainly to state Holborn, meaning part of Holborn – called Hatton Garden. St Peter's church is defunct, rationalising the number of churches in line with population changes of the district.

History

Beginnings

William Henry, 2nd Baron Leigh gave the site for the church. It was built with funds from John Hubbard, 1st Baron Addington, and designed by William Butterfield in 1859. Construction occurred between 1861 and 1862 in yellow and red stock bricks with stone dressings and tiled roofs. In 1862 Alexander Mackonochie became its first perpetual curate. He introduced a daily Eucharist, which featured Gregorian chant and significant ritual elements (e.g. the lighting of altar candles and the cleansing of eucharistic vessels at the altar). St Alban's was the first Anglican church to hold the three-hour devotion on Good Friday (in 1864) and one of the first to celebrate a Harvest Festival. Mackonochie also openly heard confessions. Mackonochie's pastoral ministry was typical of the 19th-century ritualist "slum priest". With his two curates, Arthur Stanton (who remained at the church until his death in 1913) and Edward Russell, and lay assistants he founded schools, soup kitchens, a working men's club, mothers' meetings, clothing funds and more. Though he remained until 1882 and remained as an assistant priest thereafter, he became known as "the martyr of St Alban's" from those making "regular" Low Church requests and moves to temper his ritualism.

In 1891 a chapel was added to designs by Charles Henry Money Mileham (1837–1917), with the chapel's stained glass by Charles Eamer Kempe added in 1898 – it now also contains two Stations of the Cross by Ninian Comper.

The 1890s saw the future bishop Hensley Henson (then vicar of St Margaret's Barking) frequently visit as a guest preacher.

1900–present
In 1938 the church hosted England's first complete performance of Olivier Messiaen's La Nativité du Seigneur, organised by Felix Aprahamian and played by the composer himself. The church was burned out during the London Blitz in 1941, though the chapel survived. The main church was restored by Adrian Gilbert Scott between 1959 and 1961, including a new organ by John Compton. Beside the church's entrance is a 1985 sculpture by Hans Feibusch entitled 'Jesus being Raised from the Dead' – the same artist had produced the church's current set of Stations of the Cross (date unknown) and a mural of the Holy Trinity for the east wall (1966).

On 9 June 1990 the church hosted the foundation of Affirming Catholicism, representing a liberal strand of Anglo-Catholicism, though the church itself is now considered a traditionalist Anglo-Catholic parish – as such, it is under the Alternative Episcopal Oversight of the Bishop of Fulham (currently Jonathan Baker).

The current vicar is Fr Christopher Smith who has been in the post since 2011. He was preceded by Fr Howard Levett who retired in 2010.

Organists

Gallery of architectural features

References

Grade II* listed churches in London
Church of England church buildings in the London Borough of Camden
Anglo-Catholic church buildings in the London Borough of Camden
Grade II* listed buildings in the London Borough of Camden
Churches completed in 1862
19th-century Church of England church buildings
1862 establishments in England
William Butterfield buildings
Holborn
Gothic Revival church buildings in London
Adrian Gilbert Scott buildings